The diving skink (Amphiglossus astrolabi) is a species of skink. It is endemic to Madagascar.

References

astrolabi
Endemic fauna of Madagascar
Reptiles described in 1839
Taxa named by André Marie Constant Duméril
Taxa named by Gabriel Bibron